Matthew 15 is the fifteenth chapter in the Gospel of Matthew in the New Testament section of the Christian Bible. It concludes the narrative about Jesus' ministry in Galilee and can be divided into the following subsections:
Discourse on Defilement (15:1–20)
Exorcising the Canaanite woman's daughter (15:21–28)
Healing many on a mountain (15:29-31)
Feeding the 4000 (15:32–39)

Text
The original text was written in Koine Greek. This chapter is divided into 39 verses.

Textual witnesses
Some early manuscripts containing the text of this chapter are:
Codex Vaticanus (325-350)
Codex Sinaiticus (330-360)
Codex Bezae (~400)
Codex Washingtonianus (~400)
Codex Ephraemi Rescriptus (~450)
Codex Purpureus Rossanensis (6th century)
Codex Petropolitanus Purpureus (6th century; extant verses 14-31)
Codex Sinopensis (6th century; extant verses 11-39)
Uncial 0237 (6th century; extant verses 12-15,17-19)

Locations and timing
Most of the events recorded in this chapter took place in Galilee. Verse 1 refers to scribes and Pharisees who have come from Jerusalem. The word order is "scribes and Pharisees" in the Textus Receptus, but "Pharisees and scribes" in Westcott and Hort's critical edition. Theologian Johann Bengel makes the point that these events could not therefore have taken place at the time of the Passover.

Verses 21 to 28 refer to an excursion to the region of Tyre and Sidon, after which Jesus returned to Galilee and 'skirted' or walked beside the Sea of Galilee to a mountain on the lake's eastern shore. Harold H. Buls notes that "at this point in the life of Jesus", he is "less than a year from his suffering and death".

At the close of the chapter (verse 39)  he "got into the boat, and came to the region of Magdala" or Magadan. According to E. H. Plumptre in Anglican bishop Charles Ellicott's Commentary, "the better [manuscripts] give the reading Magadan. The King James Version translates this text as "the coasts of Magdala". Heinrich Ewald thinks the reference may be to Megiddo, but Heinrich Meyer criticises this opinion because Megiddo is "too far inland". The parallel passage in Mark's gospel gives (in the majority of manuscripts) a quite different place name, Dalmanutha, although a handful of manuscripts give either Magdala or Magadan, possibly through assimilation with the Matthean text.

Verse 16
Then he said, “Are you also still without understanding?" (New Revised Standard Version) 
So Jesus said, “Are you also still without understanding? (New King James Version) 
The word "Jesus" is probably an addition.

See also
 Galilee
 Magdala
 Miracles of Jesus
 Sidon
 Tyre
 Related Bible parts: Mark 7, Mark 8

References

External links
 King James Bible - Wikisource
English Translation with Parallel Latin Vulgate
Online Bible at GospelHall.org (ESV, KJV, Darby, American Standard Version, Bible in Basic English)
Multiple bible versions at Bible Gateway (NKJV, NIV, NRSV etc.)

Gospel of Matthew chapters
Phoenicians in the New Testament